Julia Ramirez is an American politician and community organizer from Chicago. She is the alderperson-elect for Chicago City Council's 12th ward, and will take office on May 13, 2023. The 12th ward is on Chicago's southwest side, and includes portions of Brighton Park, McKinley Park, and Little Village.

References 

21st-century American politicians
Living people
21st-century American women politicians
Chicago City Council members